The 13th Luftwaffe Field Division was an infantry division of the Luftwaffe branch of the Wehrmacht that fought in World War II.

History 
The 13th Luftwaffe Field Division was formed on 15 October 1942 at the Fallingbostel  Training Area. 
In early 1943, the division was transferred to Army Group North on the Eastern Front and assigned to the 18th Army. The division took over a position section on the Volkhov River in the area of Chudovo - Dymno- Spasskaya Polist. Here the division remained in the following months.
 
On 1 November 1943, the division was taken over by the Wehrmacht and renamed Feld-Division 13. In January 1944, the division was struck by the major Russian Leningrad–Novgorod offensive. In heavy rearguard action, it had to retreat to the Luga sector and from here further to the Pskow area. After a temporary deployment on the southern edge of Lake Pskov, the division moved to the area south of Ostrov. 

At the end of March 1944 the division fought on the Opochka - Pskow railway line, and suffered so many casualties that it was dissolved on 1 April 1944. 
What remained of the Division was incorporated into the 12th Luftwaffe Field Division.

Commanders
 Generalleutnant Herbert Olbrich, (November 1942 - 25 January 1943)
 Generalmajor Hans Korte, (25 January 1943 - 1 October 1943)
 Generalleutnant Hellmuth Reymann, (1 October 1943 - 1 April 1944)

Sources 
Lexikon der Wehrmacht Luftwaffen-Felddivision 13

0*013
Military units and formations established in 1942
Military units and formations disestablished in 1944